Rifkatu Adamu Chidawa (born 18 February 1956) is the Commissioner for Tourism and Culture, Niger State, Nigeria.

Early life 
Chidawa was born on 18 February 1956 in Diko of Gurara Local Government area of Niger State.

Education 
Chidawa began primary school in January 1962, then went to Government Girls Secondary School, Minna. She later obtained her National Certificate of Education in 1981. Chidawa was posted to Government Day Secondary School Suleja, Niger state for one year National Youth Service Corps programme in 1981. She obtained her first degree certificate in education (B.Ed.) from Ahmadu Bello University. She later went to University of Abuja in 1999 for a master's degree in education administration and planning.

Career 
Chidawa started her career as a teacher.  She headed various secondary schools in Abuja and Niger state. Later on, she was appointed as Commissioner of Tourism and Culture. Chidawa started a programme to perform free cancer screenings in the Gurara Local Government Area of Niger State.

Personal life 
She is married with children.

External links 
 https://mculture.nigerstate.gov. ng

References 

Living people
Ahmadu Bello University alumni
Nigerian women in politics
University of Abuja alumni
1956 births